Kamel Tahir (11 January 1945 – 11 January 2023) was an Algerian footballer who played as a goalkeeper.

Additionally, he played in 11 matches for the Algeria national team, starting on 24 November 1971 in a 0–0 draw with Libya and ending on 11 May 1974 in a 2–1 loss to Tunisia.

References

1945 births
2023 deaths
Algerian footballers
Footballers from Algiers
Association football goalkeepers
Algeria international footballers
USM Alger players
JS Kabylie players